Maharaja Pusapati Vijayrama Gajapati Raju D.Litt. was an Indian parliamentarian and philanthropist. He was the eldest son of Maharaja Alak Narayanadev Gajapathi Raju and  Vidyavathi Devi  of Vizianagaram estate in Andhra Pradesh. He was born at Phool Bagh Palace in Vizianagaram.

It is one of the 20 Sainik Schools established in India and the only one in Andhra Pradesh.

He was elected as a member of the Madras and Andhra Pradesh Legislative Assemblies during 1952–1956 and 1956–1957 respectively. He again became a member of Andhra Pradesh Legislative Assembly between 1960 and 1971 and served as a Minister in the State Council of Ministers and held various important portfolios.  He was elected to the second and fifth Lok Sabha from Visakhapatnam parliamentary constituency in 1957–1960 and 1971–1977 respectively. He was also elected to the sixth and seventh Lok Sabha from Bobbili parliamentary constituency in 1977–1980 and 1980–1984 respectively.

Raju served as the president of the Andhra Cricket Association.

See also
 Bobbili Lok Sabha Constituency
 Visakhapatnam Lok Sabha Constituency

References

External links
Biodata of P. V. G. Raju at Lok Sabha website.
Indian Princely States - Vizianagaram

India MPs 1957–1962
India MPs 1971–1977
India MPs 1977–1979
India MPs 1980–1984
Telugu monarchs
Telugu people
People from Vizianagaram district
Presidency College, Chennai alumni
People from Vizianagaram
1995 deaths
1924 births
Lok Sabha members from Andhra Pradesh
Indian National Congress politicians
20th-century Indian people
People from Uttarandhra
Indian National Congress politicians from Andhra Pradesh